Jue Chin-shen (born 20 December 1938) is a Taiwanese weightlifter. He competed in the men's middleweight event at the 1960 Summer Olympics.

References

External links
 

1938 births
Living people
Taiwanese male weightlifters
Olympic weightlifters of Taiwan
Weightlifters at the 1960 Summer Olympics
Place of birth missing (living people)